Rottne is a locality situated in Växjö Municipality, Kronoberg County, Sweden with 2,354 inhabitants in 2010.

References 

Växjö
Populated places in Kronoberg County
Populated places in Växjö Municipality
Värend